Manuel Martins da Souza (born 5 February 1941), known as Manuel, is a Brazilian former footballer.

References

1941 births
Living people
Association football forwards
Brazilian footballers
Santos FC players
Pan American Games medalists in football
Pan American Games silver medalists for Brazil
Footballers at the 1959 Pan American Games
Medalists at the 1959 Pan American Games